The 2020–21 season was the eleventh in the history of Melbourne City Football Club. The club competed in the A-League for the eleventh time. The club was scheduled to play in the 2021 AFC Champions League qualifying play-offs in June 2021, but withdrew from the competition on 4 June 2021.

Review

Background

On 26 June 2019, Melbourne City appointed Frenchman Erick Mombaerts as new head coach leading the club in being runners-up in the 2019–20 A-League regular season, 2020 A-League Grand Final and 2019 FFA Cup.

Pre-season
The 2020 FFA Cup was cancelled on 3 July 2020.

Nathaniel Atkinson had departed the club for Perth Glory on 1 September 2020. Two days later, the club appointed former assistant coach Patrick Kisnorbo to the head manager position prior to the start of the season on 3 September, after previous coach Erick Mombaerts left the club to return to his native country France. Lachlan Wales was released following the end of his contract, while Aiden O'Neill joined for City's first signing of the season on 8 September.

City signed three youthful players, Taras Gomulka, Marco Tilio and Matt Sutton along with the departure of Gianluca Iannucci on 21 September. Nathaniel Atkinson would then only after 23 days after departing City, had returned within Joshua Brillante leaving two days later. The next day had Andrew Nabbout join City after his short stint with Perth Glory.

Joe Gauci left the club without a single appearance for City and joined Adelaide United on 7 October. The following day, Ramy Najjarine was loaned to Newcastle Jets and Moudi Najjar loaned to Macarthur FC. A week later, Ben Garuccio made a return signing on 16 October.

On 16 November, City played their first friendly of the season, against rivals Melbourne Victory in a game with three 45-minute halves at Marvel Stadium which resulted in a 3–3 draw with a goal by Curtis Good and two from Jamie Maclaren. City returned to the City Football Academy for their second friendly of the season against Western United on 28 November, with a 2–1 win via goals by Andrew Nabbout and Jamie Maclaren.

Players

Transfers

Transfers in

Transfers out

From youth squad

Contract extensions

Pre-season and friendlies

Competitions

Overview

A-League

League table

Results summary

Results by round

Matches
The league fixtures were announced on 24 November 2020.

Finals series

AFC Champions League

Qualifying play-offs

Statistics

Appearances and goals
Players with no appearances not included in the list.

Goalscorers

Disciplinary record

Clean sheets

Awards

Melbourne City Player of the Month
The winner of the award was chosen via a poll on Twitter.

References

Melbourne City FC seasons
2020–21 A-League season by team